Varbitsa ("little willow") may refer to the following places in Bulgaria:

 Varbitsa (town), a town in Shumen Province
 Varbitsa Municipality
 Varbitsa Pass in the Balkan Mountains
 Varbitsa, Haskovo Province, a village in Haskovo Province
 Varbitsa, Pleven Province, a village in Pleven Province
 Varbitsa, Veliko Tarnovo Province,  a village in Gorna Oryahovitsa Municipality, Veliko Tarnovo Province
 Varbitsa (river), a river in the Rhodope Mountains

See also 
 Vrbica (disambiguation)

bg:Върбица (пояснение)